The Northern Division, Royal Artillery, was an administrative grouping of garrison units of the Royal Artillery, Artillery Militia and Artillery Volunteers within the British Army's Northern District from 1882 to 1889.

Organisation
Under General Order 72 of 4 April 1882 the Royal Artillery (RA) broke up its existing administrative brigades of garrison artillery (7th–11th Brigades, RA) and assigned the individual batteries to 11 new territorial divisions. These divisions were purely administrative and recruiting organisations, not field formations. Most were formed within the existing military districts into which the United Kingdom was divided, and for the first time associated the part-time Artillery Militia with the regulars. Shortly afterwards the Artillery Volunteers were also added to the territorial divisions. The Regular Army batteries were grouped into one brigade, usually of nine sequentially-numbered batteries and a depot battery. For these units the divisions represented recruiting districts – batteries could be serving anywhere in the British Empire and their only connection to brigade headquarters (HQ) was for the supply of drafts and recruits. The artillery militia units (sometimes referred to as regiments) already comprised a number of batteries, and were redesignated as brigades, losing their county titles in the process. The artillery volunteers, which had previously consisted of numerous independent Artillery Volunteer Corps (AVC) of various sizes, sometimes grouped into administrative brigades, had been consolidated into larger AVCs in 1881, which were now affiliated to the appropriate territorial division.

Composition
Northern Division, RA, listed as first in order of precedence, was organised within Northern District with the following composition:
 Headquarters (HQ) at Newcastle upon Tyne
1st Brigade
 HQ at Sunderland
 1st (Mountain) Bty at Weymouth – formerly 1st Bty, 7th Bde
 2nd Bty at Dover – formerly 2nd Bty, 7th Bde
 3rd Bty at Dover – formerly 3rd Bty, 7th Bde
 4th Bty at Tilbury Fort – formerly 20th Bty, 9th Bde
 5th Bty at Bermuda – formerly 15th Bty, 7th Bde
 6th Bty at Bermuda – formerly 16th Bty, 7th Bde
 7th Bty at Khyra Gully – formerly 1st Bty, 8th Bde
 8th Bty at Campbellpore – formerly 2nd Bty, 8th Bde
 9th (Mountain) Bty at Murree Hills– formerly 6th Bty, 8th Bde
 10th Bty – new Bty formed 1886
 Depot Bty at Newcastle upon Tyne – formerly 13th Bty 2nd Bde
 2nd Brigade at Hartlepool – formerly Durham Artillery Militia (6 btys)
 3rd Brigade at Berwick-upon-Tweed – formerly Northumberland Militia Artillery (6 btys)
 4th Brigade at Scarborough – formerly Yorkshire Artillery Militia (6 btys)
 1st (Northumberland and Sunderland) Northumberland Artillery Volunteers at Newcastle upon Tyne
 2nd (The Percy) Northumberland Artillery Volunteers at Alnwick
 3rd (The Tynemouth) Northumberland Artillery Volunteers at Tynemouth
 1st East Riding Artillery Volunteers at Scarborough
 2nd East Riding Artillery Volunteers at Hull
 1st North Riding Artillery Volunteers at Middlesbrough
 1st Berwick-on-Tweed Artillery Volunteers at Berwick-upon-Tweed
 1st Cumberland Artillery Volunteers at Carlisle
 1st Durham Artillery Volunteers at Hartlepool – independent from 1st Northumberland 1887
 2nd (Seaham) Durham Artillery Volunteers at Seaham
 3rd Durham Artillery Volunteers at South Shields
 4th Durham Artillery Volunteers at West Hartlepool
 1st West Riding Artillery Volunteers at Leeds
 2nd West Riding Artillery Volunteers at Bradford 
 4th (Sheffield) West Riding Artillery Volunteers at Sheffield
 1st Newcastle-upon-Tyne Artillery Volunteers at Newcastle upon Tyne

Disbandment
In 1889 the garrison artillery was reorganised again into three large divisions of garrison artillery and one of mountain artillery. Although the names of the garrison divisions were still territorial (Eastern, Southern and Western) the assignment of units to them was geographically arbitrary, with the militia and volunteer units formerly in Northern Division being grouped in the Southern and Western Divisions (where there were the most coast defences to be manned in time of war), while the regular batteries were distributed across all four divisions and completely renumbered.

See also
 Royal Garrison Artillery
 List of Royal Artillery Divisions 1882–1902
 Eastern Division, Royal Artillery
 Southern Division, Royal Artillery
 Western Division, Royal Artillery
 Mountain Division, Royal Artillery

Footnotes

Notes

References
 J.B.M. Frederick, Lineage Book of British Land Forces 1660–1978, Vol II, Wakefield: Microform Academic, 1984, ISBN 1-85117-009-X.
 Lt-Gen H.G. Hart, The New Annual Army List, Militia List, Yeomanry Cavalry List and Indian Civil Service List for 1884, London: John Murray, 1883.
 Lt-Gen H.G. Hart, The New Annual Army List, Militia List, Yeomanry Cavalry List and Indian Civil Service List for 1890, London: John Murray, 1889.
 Lt-Col M.E.S. Lawes, Battery Records of the Royal Artillery, 1859–1877, Woolwich: Royal Artillery Institution, 1970.
 Norman E.H. Litchfield, The Militia Artillery 1852–1909 (Their Lineage, Uniforms and Badges), Nottingham: Sherwood Press, 1987, ISBN 0-9508205-1-2.
 Norman Litchfield & Ray Westlake, The Volunteer Artillery 1859–1908 (Their Lineage, Uniforms and Badges), Nottingham: Sherwood Press, 1982, ISBN 0-9508205-0-4.
 Col K. W. Maurice-Jones, The History of Coast Artillery in the British Army, London: Royal Artillery Institution, 1959/Uckfield: Naval & Military Press, 2005, ISBN 978-1-845740-31-3.
 War Office, Monthly Army List, London: HM Stationery Office, 1882–89.

Royal Artillery divisions
Military units and formations in Newcastle upon Tyne
Military units and formations established in 1882
Military units and formations disestablished in 1889